The emblem of Vietnam, formally the National emblem of the Socialist Republic of Vietnam is circular, has a red background and a yellow star in the middle which represent the five main classes in Vietnamese society—intellectuals, farmers, workers, business people and military personnel; the revolutionary history and bright future of Vietnam. The cog and crops represent the cooperation of agriculture and industrial labor.

According to the Constitution of Vietnam:

History 
 

During the 1950s, a number of countries around the world established diplomatic relations with the Democratic Republic of Vietnam. In order to expand relations with other countries and affirm Vietnam's sovereignty through diplomatic activities, the Ministry of Foreign Affairs has sent an official dispatch to the National Assembly Standing Committee on the creation of the national emblem. The Workers' Party of North Vietnam and the North Vietnamese government advocated for the creation of a national emblem "to achieve orderliness for international dealings". The coat of arms was designed by artist Bùi Trang Chước and was edited by artist Trần Văn Cẩn. 

North Vietnam adopted its national emblem on 30 November 1955. 

In June 1953 Bùi Trang Chước entered a contest to design the national emblem of the Democratic Republic of Vietnam, in which he submitted 112 different detailed research drawings, sketches and pencil drawings. Of his submissions 15 sketches were selected by the Central Committee of Fine Arts and Arts and sent to the Ministry of Propaganda for submission to the Prime Minister in October 1954.

The design closely resembles the emblem of the People's Republic of China and the entire emblem is based on the coat of arms of the Soviet Union. 

Later, in his memoir "I draw the model of the National Emblem" (Tôi vẽ mẫu Quốc huy) by Bùi Trang Chước published on 26 April 1985, he wrote: "My last sketch of the [North] Vietnamese National Emblem back then was for presentation. In a circular shape, the two sides are surrounded by Vietnamese rice grains with some rice flowers hanging inside holding an anvil at the bottom, symbolising agriculture. Under the anvil is a silk strip that later received the words "Democratic Republic of Vietnam" (Việt Nam Dân chủ Cộng hòa). The two ends of the silk strip wrap the two sides of the rice flower from the bottom up, each side two segments. In the upper centre in the background is a yellow star superimposed on a red background, under the star near the center of the background is an arc of the sun with rays around it, evoking an image of dawn." He noted that his entire National Emblem design uses only two colours yellow and red, the traditional colours of the nation. 

After sending this sketch for comment to the North Vietnamese president Hồ Chí Minh a number of corrections were requested. President Hồ Chí Minh commented that; "The image of the anvil is an individual handicraft, so the image should be replaced with something that represents modern industry." After 3 edits, from early 1955 to September 1955, painter Bùi Trang Chước completed the model. 

Regarding this last sample of the North Vietnamese national emblem, artist Bùi Trang Chước wrote: "This time I also drew a circle around the two sides, there are more rice flowers extending upwards, adjacent to the border. Each of them are located at the top of the circle, the two sides still keep the rice flowers hanging down to embrace now a cogwheel rather than an anvil. At the bottom, the silk ribbon in the middle has the words Việt Nam Dân chủ Cộng hòa ("Democratic Republic of Vietnam"). The silk ribbon is still wrapped on the rice stalks with 2 sections on each side, the roots of the rice flowers cross each other to form the emblem." The sun below the star and its rays were also removed. In terms of colour, the background inside of the North Vietnamese National Emblem and the silk medal is red, while other motifs such as the rice flowers, stars and wheels are yellow.

After the 5th National Assembly session (September 1955) gave advice to correct a few minor details before the national emblem could be approved. But because at the time Bùi Trang Chước had to accept the government's secret mission to the People's Republic of China to draw and paint designs for the new banknotes, the editing of a few details (such as the lengthening of the rice stalks from the base to the sole) was assigned to artist Trần Văn Cẩn.

Following the merger of the Democratic Republic of Vietnam with the Republic of South Vietnam on 2 July 1976, a slightly modified version was adopted by the newly established Socialist Republic of Vietnam. The new version replaced the wording "Việt Nam Dân chủ Cộng hòa" with "Cộng hòa Xã hội chủ nghĩa Việt Nam". 

In 2007 a representative of the National Assembly of Vietnam, the artist Trần Khánh Chương, commented that the printing process of Vietnam's national emblems featured too many errors and problems, resulting in many inaccurate "versions". Notable errors included: the rice corn is too big (just like the wheat corn), the gear only has 6 teeth instead of 10, the circles inside the gear are not accurate, and the space between the rice corn appears uneven. 

On 25 December 2021 the Prime Minister of Vietnam issued Quyết định số 2198/QĐ-TTg (Decision No. 2198/QD-TTg) on the recognition of National Treasures which declared the collections of the 1953–1955 North Vietnamese national emblem proposals by Bùi Trang Chước as a national treasure, these sketches are currently (as of December 2022) kept at the National Archives Center III, Department of State Records and Archives, Ministry of Home Affairs. After this decision these sketches were put on public display as a part of the Ký ức của bạn, lịch sử của chúng ta ("Your memory – Our history") exhibition. To aid researchers (both Vietnamese and foreign) the National Archives Center III plans on digitising the North Vietnamese national emblem proposals and make them publicly available online.

Others  

The coat of arms of the State of Vietnam (which after the 1954 Geneva Agreements became known as "South Vietnam") featured a blue dragon (a symbol of the Nguyễn dynasty) on an escutcheon (shield) of yellow and red stripes.

List

See also 

 Flag of Vietnam 
 List of flags of Vietnam 
 List of Vietnamese provincial and territorial symbols 
 National Emblem of the People's Republic of China 
 Seals of the Nguyễn dynasty 
 Socialist heraldry

Notes

References 

Vietnam
National symbols of Vietnam
Vietnamese heraldry
Vietnam
Vietnam
Vietnam
Vietnam
Vietnam
Vietnam
Vietnam